Dysauxes kaschmiriensis is a moth of the family Erebidae. It was described by Rothschild in 1910. It is found in Kashmir, Pakistan and India.

Subspecies
Dysauxes kaschmiriensis kaschmiriensis (Kashmir)
Dysauxes kaschmiriensis karapaki Ignatyev & Zolotuhin, 2006 (Pakistan)
Dysauxes kaschmiriensis kautti Ignatyev & Zolotuhin, 2006 (India: Himachal Pradesh)

References

 Natural History Museum Lepidoptera generic names catalog

Syntomini
Moths described in 1910